Mount Wise may refer to:

 Mount Wise, Plymouth, an area in Devon, England 
 Mount Wise (Antarctica), a summit in Victoria Land, Antarctica

See also 
 Mount Wyss, a peak in the Shackleton Coast of Antarctica